Jandwala Bagar, or Jandwala is a village in Bhattu Kalan tehsil in the Fatehabad district of Haryana, India. The local language is Hindi.

Infrastructure
In February 2013 Fatehabad Deputy Commissioner Saket Kumar visited several villages, including Jandwala Bagar, to inspect and discuss aspects of their infrastructure, such as development.

Agriculture
In a September 2004 visit to Jandwala Bagar, Haryana Chief Minister Om Prakash Chautala asked villagers about their general welfare and about the state of their cattle and crops.

Schools
There are two schools in the village: a primary school that teaches up to the fifth grade, and a secondary school for up to the twelfth grade.

See also
 List of villages in Fatehabad district

References

Further reading
 

Villages in Fatehabad district